Enn Tupp (born 3 October 1941 in Vohjna Parish, Virumaa) is an Estonian politician, diplomat, biathlete and Estonian Defense Forces major.

From 1994 to 1995, he was Minister of Defence.

References

Living people
1941 births
Isamaa politicians
Defence Ministers of Estonia
Estonian diplomats
Estonian male biathletes
20th-century Estonian military personnel
21st-century Estonian military personnel
Voters of the Estonian restoration of Independence
Recipients of the Order of the National Coat of Arms, 3rd Class
Recipients of the Order of the National Coat of Arms, 5th Class
University of Tartu alumni
People from Kadrina Parish